Brahea armata, commonly known as Mexican blue palm or blue hesper palm, is a large evergreen tree of the palm family Arecaceae, endemic to Baja California, Mexico. It is widely planted as an ornamental.

Description 
The leaves are persistent in nature, forming a shag around the trunk; in cultivation they are typically burned or cut off. The inflorescences extend out beyond the crown, reaching  in length.

Distribution and habitat 

This species is endemic to the Mexican state of Baja California, distributed from just south of the international border near the Jacumba Mountains to the Central Desert and Isla Angel de la Guarda. Plants growing in the Sierra de San Francisco in Baja California Sur may be of a different species. It is locally common in arroyos and canyon bottoms, and has been observed growing in rock crevices at higher elevations. It is sometimes found with Washingtonia filifera or Washingtonia robusta.

Uses 
Brahea armata has an attractive appearance, especially when young, and is commonly available at nurseries in the American southwest and in warm temperate locations elsewhere. In the UK it has gained the Royal Horticultural Society’s Award of Garden Merit. 
It is found under a variety of names, including "Mexican blue palm", "blue hesper palm", "big blue hesper palm", "blue fan palm", "sweet brahea", and "palma blanca".

The Cocopah people ate the seeds after roasting them.

References

Further reading
 Raymond M. Turner, Janice E. Bowers, and Tony L. Burgess, Sonoran Desert Plants: an Ecological Atlas (Tucson: The University of Arizona Press, 1995) pp. 115–116

armata
Trees of Baja California
Ornamental trees
Drought-tolerant trees
Endemic flora of Mexico